Computer Animation and Social Agents (CASA) was founded in 1988 in Geneva, Switzerland and it is the oldest international conference in computer animation and social agents in the world.

Venues

References

 CASA 2012 CFP on EuroVR Portal
 CASA 2012 CFP on UUID
 Proceedings CASA 2003 on IEEE Xplore

External links
 Past Conferences organized by IMI

Computer animation